Jonathan Mark Christopher "Joe" Saward (born 14 July 1961 in London) is a British Formula One journalist.

Life and career
Saward was educated at Haileybury College and attained a degree in history at Bedford College, University of London. In 1984 he joined Autosport magazine in London. He began reporting on Formula One in 1988, working alongside Nigel Roebuck and remained as Grand Prix Editor of Autosport until 1993. He later wrote for the F1 News magazine, and went on to create the JSBM newsletter and more recently a Formula One blog, called Joeblogsf1. He is also the F1 Editor of Autoweek magazine.

This was followed by the launch of GrandPrix+, an e-magazine developed in partnership with David Tremayne. Saward hosts audiences for Formula One fans who can ask questions about the sport. He also takes part in Missed Apex podcasts. He has the distinction of attending all the F1 races since 1988, is accredited as an FIA Formula One Permanent Passholder, and previously sat on the board of Caterham Cars as a non-executive director.

Saward has also written a number of books, including The World Atlas of Motor Racing. In 2007 he published The Grand Prix Saboteurs, detailing the story of racing drivers who went on to establish a sabotage network in France during World War II. As a result, the Guild of Motoring Writers named Saward the Renault UK Author of the Year. He published a biography of his great-grandfather, Henry George Kendall, The Man who Caught Crippen. He has also published four volumes of Fascinating F1 Facts.

Saward is the son of clergyman Canon Michael Saward (died 2015) and the brother of activist Jill Saward (died 2017).

He lives in France.

Sources

References

External links
Joe Saward's blog
JSBM Newsletter
GrandPrix+, F1 e-Magazine
Missed Apex podcast

Living people
1961 births
People educated at Haileybury and Imperial Service College
Formula One journalists and reporters
British motoring journalists
Alumni of Bedford College, London
English motorsport people